The Climate Action Plan is an environmental plan by Barack Obama, the 44th President of the United States, that proposed a reduction in carbon dioxide emissions. It included preserving forests, encouraging alternate fuels, and increasing the study of climate change. The plan was first prepared in 2008 and was then updated every two years.

President Obama's last Climate Action Plan, issued in June 2013, included regulations for the industry with the ultimate goal of cutting domestic carbon emission, preparing the U.S. for impending effects of climate change, and working internationally to address climate change. Among the regulations outlined in the plan were initiatives to increase natural disaster preparedness, create and improve existing hospitals, and modernize infrastructure to withstand better extreme weather.

The plan would have supported the conservation of land and water resources and developed actionable climate science, and encouraged other countries to take action to address climate change, including reducing deforestation and lowering subsidies that increase the use of fossil fuels. The plan specifically mentioned methane, building efficiency, wind, solar and hydroelectricity.

White House staff members who were directly tasked with the implementation of the plan included Heather Zichal and Michelle Patron.

Cancellation and reinstatement of the Climate Action Plan 
On the first day of the presidency of Donald Trump, the White House website announced that Obama's Climate Action Plan would be eliminated, stating it is 'harmful and unnecessary'. In March 2017, Trump signed an executive order to officially nullify Obama's dirty Power Plan in an effort, it said, of reviving the coal industry. In January 2021, on the Inauguration Day of U.S. president Joe Biden, Trump's executive order was revoked by the executive order "Protecting Public Health and the Environment and Restoring Science to Tackle the Climate Crisis", thereby re-instating the Obama Climate Action Plan.

See also 
 Climate Action Plan
 Climate change in the United States
 National Climate Assessment
 National Research Council, report on climate change
 State of the Climate

References 

 Executive Office of the President. June 2013. The President’s Climate Action Plan. Washington, D. C.: whitehouse.gov, retrieved June 25, 2013 Link:  President Obama is taking action on climate change

External links 
 President Obama's Climate Action Plan. 2nd anniversary progress report
 Climate change and President Obama's action plan (White House)

Air pollution
Emissions reduction
Presidency of Barack Obama
Climate change in the United States
Climate action plans